Sir Thomas Wrightson, 1st Baronet,  (31 March 1839 – 18 June 1921) was a British Conservative politician.

Wrightson sat as Member of Parliament (MP) for Stockton between 1892 and 1895 and for St Pancras East between 1899 and 1906. In 1900 he was created a baronet, of Neasham Hall in the County of Durham, and was appointed a Deputy Lieutenant of Durham on 4 December 1900. He died in June 1921, aged 82.

He was the brother of John Wrightson, the founder of Downton Agricultural College.

References

Kidd, Charles, Williamson, David (editors). Debrett's Peerage and Baronetage (1990 edition). New York: St Martin's Press, 1990.

External links 

1839 births
1921 deaths
Baronets in the Baronetage of the United Kingdom
Deputy Lieutenants of Durham
UK MPs 1892–1895
UK MPs 1895–1900
UK MPs 1900–1906
Conservative Party (UK) MPs for English constituencies